Carolyn Dorin-Ballard (born 1964, Linden, New Jersey) is one of the top female ten-pin bowlers in the world.  She is a member of the Professional Women's Bowling Association (1990–2003 and 2015–present) and has bowled in PBA Tournaments as well. She was an exempt competitor in the 2008–09 and 2009-10 PBA Women's Series seasons, which were sponsored by the United States Bowling Congress (USBC). Between the PWBA and the PBA Women's Series, she has won 22 professional titles. Carolyn was a 2007 inductee into the USBC Hall of Fame.

Dorin-Ballard is a member of the Roto Grip Professional Staff, and also endorses Turbo 2-N-1 Grips, USBC and Ballard's Bowling Solutions. On March 1, 2011, she was named the USBC's Director of Coaching.

Personal and family 
Her father was a POW during World War II.

Born and raised in Linden, New Jersey, she graduated from Linden High School in 1985.

Dorin-Ballard is married to PBA Hall of Famer Del Ballard Jr., whom she met in college. The couple has a daughter, Alyssa, and the family now resides in North Richland Hills, Texas. She is also the sister of top female bowler, former PWBA member and TV bowling analyst Cathy Dorin-Lizzi. Her brother-in-law (Cathy's husband), Jeff Lizzi, was a member of the PBA and won a 1992 PBA Tour title.

In bowling circles, Carolyn is often referred to by just the initials, "CDB."

Bowling career

Amateur 
Carolyn attended West Texas State University on a partial bowling scholarship. While there, she led the University to back to back national titles and was a three-time All-American. She was the MVP of the Intercollegiate Bowling Championships in 1989. She graduated in 1989 with a B.A. in Communications.

She has been a member of Team USA for multiple seasons. In 2011, she was part of the team that went to the WTBA World Women's Championships in Hong Kong and took home gold for the United States in the team event for the first time since 1987.

Professional 

During the original existence of the PWBA Tour, Carolyn was one of its top bowlers.  Carolyn had 20 Tour titles over a 14-year career (1990–2003). She won her first title in a doubles tournament in 1991 with her partner, Lisa Wagner, who was one of the top bowlers on the tour in the 1980s. With the support of her sister and husband, her career took off in 1994, when she began a string of eight titles in four seasons, beginning with her first singles title, the Lady Ebonite Classic. In that period she was the runner up in the Player of the Year voting all four seasons.

In 2001, she had her career year. She won seven titles, posted an average of 214.73, was Player of the Year, and earned $135,045 in prize money.  She received many honors this year including nomination for an ESPY award. She broke eight tour records that season.

Her career PWBA accomplishments include 20 PWBA titles, three major titles (1997 and 2001 Brunswick World Open, 2001 WIBC Queens), and two Player of the Year awards. In WIBC (now USBC) competition, she won three WIBC Titles (2000 All-Events Champion, 2001 Team Champion, 2004 Doubles Champion with Lynda Barnes). She was a seven-time WIBC All American and six-time Bowlers Journal All-American. Before the PWBA disbanded, she had moved up to sixth on the all-time Tour earnings list (over $910,000). She won two PBA Women's Series titles (2007 Great Lakes Classic and 2008 Cheetah Championship). She also won the PBA Women's Series Showdown, a non-title event held in April, 2009.

In 2006, she joined top female bowlers from around the world in the USBC Women's Challenge tournament. The event took place on a single lane, in the middle of a shopping mall in Las Vegas, Nevada. This event was particularly challenging, because all of the distractions of a mall (music, voices, people walking in the upper level) were present during the entire tournament.  She made it to the semi-finals where she was defeated by Clara Guerrero. (Guerrero would go on to lose to Cara Honeychurch in the final.)

In 2007, Dorin-Ballard became the first woman to bowl a perfect game in the USBC Masters.

The only major missing from Dorin-Ballard's resume is the U.S. Women's Open, although she has made the semi-finals five times (2003, 2007, 2008, 2009 and 2010) with runner-up finishes in the 2003 and 2009 events.

Carolyn is known as one of the best female bowlers of all time, and at the Kegel training center also has the title of being the most accurate player in history of the testing center, hitting the exact target over 30 times in a row at exactly the same speed. During the PBA Women's Series Showdown in 2009, CDB rolled 20 consecutive strikes over two games to earn the distinction of rolling the most consecutive strikes in the history of televised bowling (male or female). (The previous mark of 18 consecutive strikes had been set by the PBA's Ryan Shafer two years earlier.) Currently a Roto Grip staffer, Carolyn is representing the brand with her recent bowling with Team USA and was on the roster for the PanAmerican games.

In 2014, Dorin-Ballard won the BPAA's Dick Weber Bowling Ambassador Award, an honor given annually to the "bowling athlete who has consistently shown grace on and off the lanes by promoting the sport of bowling in a positive manner."

Carolyn currently manages the NYC Kingpins PBA League team, while husband Del manages the Motown Muscle team.

References

Sources

Carolyn Fan Website (some info outdated)

American ten-pin bowling players
Linden High School (New Jersey) alumni
People from Linden, New Jersey
Sportspeople from Union County, New Jersey
1964 births
Living people
People from Keller, Texas
Bowling broadcasters